Sandarna BK is a Swedish football club located in Göteborg.

Background
Sandarna BK currently plays in Division 4 Göteborg B which is the sixth tier of Swedish football. They play their home matches at the Gröna vallen in Göteborg.

The club is affiliated to Göteborgs Fotbollförbund.  Sandarna BK represented Sweden in the 2011 UEFA Regions' Cup but were knocked out in the Preliminary Round in Macedonia after playing 3 matches in Group C. They have competed in the Svenska Cupen on 20 occasions and have played 27 matches in the competition.
Former stats Ville Vlljannen, Dennis Palovic, Kenneth Persson, Peter Sörhall, Karoly Fenesan. 

Ledgens of Sandarna Fritz Sandin Kent "KK" Kristiansson and also Morgan Melker Bernt Kihlberg.

Season to season

In their most successful period Sandarna BK competed in the following divisions:

In recent seasons Sandarna BK have competed in the following divisions:

Footnotes

External links
 Sandarna BK – Official website
 Sandarna BK on Facebook

Football clubs in Gothenburg
Football clubs in Västra Götaland County